Melanoides turritispira is a species of gastropod in the Thiaridae family. It is endemic to Lake Malawi. Its natural habitat is freshwater lakes. It is threatened by habitat loss.

Original description by Edgar Albert Smith from 1877 describes a juvenile snail.

The IUCN Red List of Threatened Species treats the species as a synonym of Melanoides polymorpha.

References

Fauna of Lake Malawi
Thiaridae
Freshwater snails of Africa
Taxa named by Edgar Albert Smith
Gastropods described in 1877
Taxonomy articles created by Polbot
Taxobox binomials not recognized by IUCN